Minda Incorporated, established in 1898, provides support to children and adults with disability in Adelaide, South Australia and is the largest non-Government disability support organisation in the state.

The not-for-profit organisation offers support and opportunity to approximately 1,750 South Australians with disability in the areas of accommodation (at its Brighton neighbourhood and in the community), supported employment, lifestyle services and respite. It is Minda's vision To be a leading force for good within Australia in supporting people living with an intellectual disability in all aspects of their lives.

Minda has office locations in the suburb of Brighton, in Reynella, Ottoway and Mount Gambier. The organisation was originally formed to provide support and lodging for children with intellectual disabilities.

History
Prior to 1898, children with intellectual disabilities were housed along with adults in the lunatic asylum at Parkside. After lobbying by concerned citizens, notably George Ash M.P., the government promised £500 towards a better quality institution specifically for children, provided that a similar amount was raised from donations. This target was achieved and in 1897 a home was purchased on Fullarton Road, Fullarton. The home was registered as the Home for Weak Minded Children, but was called Minda, from a Kaurna word meaning 'place of shelter and protection'. The first children moved in during May 1898.

A larger property was bought at Brighton in 1909, and with further government support a new and larger home was erected. This was incorporated as Minda Home in September 1911. Further buildings and additions were built over the next two decades, and by 1934 Minda operated a farm and dormitory at Blackwood (now Craigburn Farm).

Despite Minda being established to provide a better environment for 'weak minded' children than Parkside Mental Hospital, Parkside continued to accommodate such children with several children being transferred from Minda to Parkside in 1940.

In 1980, 55 hectares of Craigburn Farm was donated for inclusion in Sturt Gorge Recreation Park as part of an agreement to allow subdivision of land south of the Sturt River in Flagstaff Hill. The major part of the balance of the farm at Blackwood was sold in the 1990s and forms the major part of Craigburn Farm, a major housing development. In 2007 the state government announced that the farm's dam would be included in an enlarged Sturt Gorge Recreation Park, building on the original donation and saving the dam from demolition.

References

External links

The Minda Inc website
SA Link-up

Medical and health organisations based in South Australia
Organizations established in 1898
Disability organisations based in Australia